Horizon is a current and long-running BBC popular science and philosophy documentary programme. Series one was broadcast in 1964 and  it is in its 56th series. Over 1,250 episodes have been broadcast (including specials) with an average of 23 episodes per series during the 56-year run.

 1964–1969 – 135 episodes
 1970–1979 – 299 episodes
 1980–1989 – 234 episodes
 1990–1999 – 220 episodes
 2000–2009 – 191 episodes
 2010–2019 – 167 episodes
 Since 2020 – 14 episodes

Series 1: 1964–1965

Series 2: 1965–1966

Series 3: 1966–1967

Series 4: 1967–1968

Series 5: 1968–1969

Series 6: 1969–1970

Series 7: 1970–1971

Series 8: 1971–1972

Series 9: 1972–1973

Series 10: 1973–1974

Series 11: 1974–1975

Series 12: 1975–1976

Series 13: 1976–1977

Series 14: 1977–1978

Series 15: 1978–1979

Series 16: 1979–1980

Series 17: 1980–1981

Series 18: 1981–1982

Series 19: 1982–1983

Series 20: 1983–1984

Series 21: 1984–1985

Series 22: 1985–1986

Series 23: 1987

Series 24: 1988

Series 25: 1988–1989

Series 26: 1990

Series 27: 1990–1991

Series 28: 1992

Series 29: 1992–1993

Series 30: 1993–1994

Series 31: 1994–1995

Series 32: 1995–1996

Series 33: 1996–1997

Series 34: 1997–1998

Series 35: 1998–1999

Series 36: 1999–2000

Series 37: 2000–2001

Series 38: 2001–2002

Series 39: 2002–2003
Horizon Revisited was broadcast on BBC Four and shown between 2002 and 2003. Each of the seven episodes takes information and clips from previous edition of Horizon and updates them with current thinking on each of the topics at hand. These are similar in format to the current 'Horizon Guide' special episodes.

Series 40: 2003–2004

Series 41: 2004–2005

Series 42: 2005–2006

Series 43: 2006–2007

Series 44: 2007–2008

Series 45: 2008–2009

Series 46: 2009–2010

Series 47: 2010–2011

Series 48: 2011–2012

Series 49: 2012–2013

Series 50: 2013–2014

Series 51: 2014–2015

Series 52: 2016

Series 53: 2017

Series 54: 2018

Series 55: 2019

Series 56: 2020

Series 57: 2021

Series 58: 2022

References

General
"Horizon archives". BBC Retrieved on 2009-12-08
"Horizon episodes coming up". BBC Retrieved on 2009-12-08
"Recent Horizons". BBC Retrieved on 2009-12-08
"Episode Guide". BBC Retrieved 2013-02-01

Specific

Horizon
Horizon (British TV series)
Horizon